The Civil Union Act 2004 is an Act of Parliament in New Zealand. It was passed into law on Thursday 9 December 2004 by a final vote of 65–55 in the New Zealand Parliament. The Act makes it legal for those in same-sex as well as heterosexual relationships to enter into a civil-union.

The act was opposed by religious groups, including the Catholic Church. Then New Zealand National Party leader Don Brash opposed the bill, but only as he believed it should be put to a referendum. The Act was widely supported by the then-governing New Zealand Labour Party.

It is administered by the Ministry of Justice and is under the jurisdiction of the Family Court.

The Civil Union Act 2004 is still in force, despite New Zealand providing same-sex marriages since 19 August 2013, under the Marriage (Definition of Marriage) Amendment Act 2013.

See also
Civil union in New Zealand
Marriage in New Zealand

References

External links
Text of the Act

Statutes of New Zealand
2004 in New Zealand law
Same-sex union legislation
New Zealand family law
2004 in LGBT history
Recognition of same-sex unions in Oceania
LGBT law in New Zealand